Styron may refer to:

Chemicals
 Styron (company), American plastics manufacturer, part of Dow Chemical Company
 Styron, polystyrene resins by Dow Chemical Company
 Cinnamyl alcohol, an organic compound used in perfumery

People
 Alexandra Styron, American author and professor
 Don Styron (born 1940), American athlete
 William Styron (1925–2006), American writer